Haemanthamine is a crinine-like alkaloid from the Amaryllidaceae plant family.

References 

Quinoline alkaloids
Isoquinoline alkaloids
Tertiary amines
Benzodioxoles